Orthochromis luichensis is a species of cichlid endemic to Tanzania where it is only known to occur in tributaries of the Luiche River.  This species can reach a length of  SL.

References

External links

Endemic fauna of Tanzania
luichensis
Fish described in 1998
Taxa named by Lothar Seegers
Fish of Tanzania
Taxonomy articles created by Polbot